Vittatus is a genus of spiders in the family Linyphiidae. It was first described in 2014 by Zhao & Li.

Species
, it contains 4 species:
Vittatus bian Zhao & Li, 2014 − China
Vittatus fencha Zhao & Li, 2014 (type) − China
Vittatus latus Zhao & Li, 2014 − China
Vittatus pan Zhao & Li, 2014 − China

References

Linyphiidae
Araneomorphae genera
Spiders of China